Soyuqbulaq (also, Soyuq Bulaq) is a village in the Agstafa Rayon of Azerbaijan. It forms part of the municipality of Köçvəlili.

In 2006, a French–Azerbaijani team discovered nine kurgans at the cemetery of Soyuqbulaq. They were dated to the beginning of the fourth millennium BC, which makes it the oldest kurgan cemetery in Transcaucasia. Similar kurgans have been found at Kavtiskhevi, Kaspi Municipality, in central Georgia.

Several other archaeological sites seem to belong to the same ancient cultural tradition as Soyuq Bulaq. They include Berikldeebi, Kavtiskhevi, Leilatepe, Boyuk Kesik, and Poylu, Agstafa, and are characterized by pottery assemblages "mainly or totally in the North Mesopotamian tradition".

Discoveries
The numerous artifacts discovered at these sites have shed light on the material and spiritual culture of this ancient people during the late Eneolithic period. Amongst the finds are stone and bone tools, metal objects, and a huge cache of clay vessels. There are also anthropomorphic and zoomorphic figurines made of clay or bone. Grain residues were also excavated.

The residents kept cattle and other domesticated animals in these settlements.

Most of these sites are associated with the Leilatepe archeological culture of the first half of the fourth millennium BCE. It is believed that this was the result of the migration of near-eastern tribes from Mesopotamia to South Caucasus, especially to Azerbaijan.

According to the excavators,

Discovery of Soyugbulaq in 2004 and subsequent excavations provided substantial proof that the practice of kurgan burial was well established in the South Caucasus during the late Eneolithic. The roots of the Leylatepe Archaeological Culture to which the Soyugbulaq kurgans belong to, stemmed from the Ubaid culture of Central Asia.

The Leylatepe Culture tribes migrated to the north in the mid-fourth millennium, B.C. and played an important part in the rise of the Maikop Culture of the North Caucasus. A number of Maikop Culture kurgans and Soyugbulaq kurgans display the same northwest to southeast grave alignment. More than that, Soyugbulaq kurgans yielded pottery forms identical to those recovered from the Maikop kurgans. These are the major factors attesting to the existence of a genetic link between the two cultures.

See also
Archaeology of Azerbaijan

References 

Populated places in Aghstafa District
Archaeology of the Caucasus
Archaeological sites in Azerbaijan